Aleksiev (masculine) or Aleksieva (feminine), also transliterated as Alexiev or Alexieva, is a Bulgarian surname.  Notable people with the surname include:

Boyko Aleksiev (born 1963), Bulgarian figure skater
Dimitar Aleksiev (born 1993), Bulgarian footballer
Elena Alexieva (born 1975), Bulgarian writer
Evgueniy Alexiev (born 1967), French opera singer
Metodi Aleksiev (1887–1924), Bulgarian revolutionary
Rayko Aleksiev (1893–1944), Bulgarian painter and writer
Todor Aleksiev (born 1983), Bulgarian volleyball player

See also
Aleksiev Glacier, a glacier of Graham Land, Antarctica

Bulgarian-language surnames
Patronymic surnames
Surnames from given names